The Court of Appeal is an appellate court of the judiciary system in Malaysia.  It is the second highest court in the hierarchy below the Federal Court.  This court was created in 1994 as part of reforms made to the judiciary to create a second tier appellate court after the right to appeal to the Privy Council of the United Kingdom was abolished in 1985.  The court is headed by the President of the Court of Appeal of Malaysia, who is the second most senior post in Malaysian judiciary after the Chief Justice of Malaysia.

On 17 January 2023, Abang Iskandar was sworn in by the Yang di-Pertuan Agong as the President of the Court of Appeal, succeeding Rohana Yusuf, the first woman to serve in this position, who had retired upon reaching the mandatory retirement age in November 2022.

Presidents of the Court of Appeal

Current judges 
This is the list of current judges of the Court of Appeal.

See also 
 1Malaysia Development Berhad scandal

References

External links 
 The Malaysian Judiciary (Official site)

Judiciary of Malaysia